This is a list of people on the postage stamps of Iceland including the years when they appeared on a stamp.

Danish dependency( –1918)
 1902 Christian IX of Denmark
 1907 Overlapping profiles of Christian IX and Frederick VIII of Denmark
 1911 Jón Sigurðsson 100th anniversary of his birth.
 1912 Frederick VIII of Denmark

Kingdom of Iceland (1918–1944)
 1920 King Christian X (the only official King of Iceland (1918–1944)(as Kristján X))
 1935 Matthias Jochumsson
 1937 King Christian X
 1941 Snorri Sturluson 700th Anniversary of the Death (3 stamps issued 17th Nov. 1941)

Iceland a republic (1944–)
 1950 Bishop Jón Arason 400th Anniversary of Death (2 stamps issued 7th Nov. 1950)
 1954 Hannes Hafstein  50th Anniversary of Appointment as First Native Minister of Iceland. (3 stamps issued 1 June 1954)
 1957 Jónas Hallgrímsson 150th Anniversary of Birth (issued 16th Nov. 1957)
 1959 Jón Þorkelsson Bicentenary of his death (2 stamps issued 5 May 1959)
 1961 Benedikt Sveinsson and Björn M. Ólsen, to celebrate the University of Iceland (3 stamps issued 6th Oct)
 1961 Jón Sigurðsson 150th anniversary of his birth.
 1963 Sigurður Guðmundsson to celebrate the National Museum (2 stamps issued 20th Feb. 1963)
 1965 Einar Benediktsson (Stamp issued 16th Nov. 1965)
 1968 Friðrik Friðriksson (Stamp issued 5th Sept. 1968)
 1968 Jón Magnússon (politician), 50th Anniversary of Independence, (2 stamps issued 1st Dec. 1968)
 1970 Grimur Thomsen (poet)  150th Anniversary of Birth (Stamp issued 19 June 1970)
 1971 Tryggvi Gunnarsson To celebrate the centenary of the Patriotic Society 1871-1971 (2 stamps issued 19th Aug. 1971)
 1975 Hallgrímur Pétursson (poet), Árni Magnússon, Einar Jónsson and Jón Eiríksson (1728-1787) Set of 4 stamps on "Celebrities" (issued 18th Sept. 1975)
 1975 Bertel Thorvaldsen Celebrating the centenary of the Thorvaldsen Society (Stamp issued 19th Nov. 1975)
 1978 Halldór Hermannsson
 1979 Jón Sigurðsson and Ingibjörg Einarsdóttir Centenary of both of their deaths  (Stamp issued 1st Nov. 1979)
 1980 Jón Sveinsson (Nonni) and Gunnar Gunnarsson writers (2 Stamps issued 28 April 1980)
 1982 Þorbjörg Sveinsdóttir a famous Icelander (Stamp issued 8th Sept. 1982)
 1983 Kristján Eldjárn
 1987 Rasmus Kristjan Rask to mark his birth Centenary
 1999 Composer Jón Leifs
 2002 Halldór Laxness
 2002 Sesselja Sigmundsdottir Advocate for Mentally Handicapped  founder of Sólheimar
 2004 Hannes Hafstein
 2007 Jónas Hallgrímsson 200th anniversary of his birth.
 2007 Frederick VIII of Denmark Royal Visit of 1907
 2011 Jón Sigurðsson 200th anniversary of his birth.

See also 
Postage stamps and postal history of Iceland

References

Sources 
 Mclean, BM Stamp Dealer Stamp Member of the A.D.P.S. - U.K. Stamp Dealers Society and Member of the I.P.D.A. - Internet Philatelic Dealers Association.
 J Smith and Associates

Iceland, List of people on stamps of
People on stamps of
Philately of Iceland
Stamps